A myoma is a type of tumor that involves muscle cells. There are two main types of myoma: 
 Leiomyomas which occur in smooth muscle. They most commonly occur as uterine fibroids, but may also form in other locations. 
 Rhabdomyomas which occur in striated muscle. They are rare tumors, occur in childhood and often become malignant.

Whether or not angiomyomas are a type of leiomyoma or a separate entity is disputed as of 2014.

Myomas are benign tumors of the uterus that can affect the fertility of a woman depending mainly on three factors:

 Size (cut off value 4-5 cm)
 Number
 Location (they can be intramural, subserous or submucous). Submucous ones are worst from a fertility point of view, while subserous are less dangerous. 

Some of the most common symptoms are: abundant menstrual bleeding, longer menstrual periods, pelvic pressure, constipation, a need to urinate continuously.

References

External links 

Types of neoplasia